This is a list of tallest buildings in Switzerland. Only habitable buildings are ranked, which excludes radio masts and towers, observation towers, steeples, chimneys and other tall architectural structures. For those, see List of tallest structures in Switzerland.

Completed buildings

Buildings under construction

See also
List of tallest structures in Switzerland
List of tallest buildings in the European Union

References

External links
Emporis: Switzerland (wrong link) 

Lists of buildings and structures in Switzerland
Switzerland
Switzerland